Roopkuvarba Kanwar (c. 1969 – 4 September 1987) was a Rajput woman who was burned alive at Deorala village of Sikar district in Rajasthan, India. At the time, she was 18 years old and had been married for eight months to Maal Singh Shekhawat, who had died a day earlier at age 24, and had no children.

Death 
Several thousand people attended. After her death, Roop Kanwar was hailed as a sati mata – a sati mother, or pure mother. The event quickly produced a public outcry in urban centres. The incident led first to state level laws to prevent such incidents, then the central government's Commission of Sati (Prevention) Act.

News reports
News reports of the incident conflict.  Some news reports claim Kanwar was forced to her death by other attendees present. Some reports state that she was told she must do Sati to bring honour to the family.

Chargesheet
The original inquiries resulted in 45 people being charged with her death; these people were acquitted. A much-publicized later investigation led to the arrest of a large number of people from Deorala, said to have been present in the ceremony, or participants in it.

Eventually, 11 people, including state politicians, were charged with glorification of sati. On 31 January 2004 a special court in Jaipur acquitted all of the 11 accused in the case.

References

Further reading

1969 births
1987 suicides
Year of birth uncertain
People who committed sati
People from Sikar district
Suicide in India
1987 deaths